Ramsey is an unincorporated community in Fayette County, West Virginia, United States.

The community was named after W. H. Ramsey, who was instrumental in securing a post office for the town.

References

Unincorporated communities in Fayette County, West Virginia
Unincorporated communities in West Virginia